Eastlake may refer to:

Places 
Australia
 Kingston, Australian Capital Territory, formerly called Eastlake
 Eastlake Football Club, an amateur Australian Rules Football Club named after that location

United States
 Eastlake, Lake County, California
 Eastlake, San Diego County, California
 Eastlake, Colorado
 Eastlake, Michigan
 Eastlake, Ohio
 Eastlake, Seattle, Washington

People
 Eastlake (surname)

Education 
 Eastlake Middle School, Chula Vista, California, US
 Eastlake High School (disambiguation), several schools

Other uses 
Eastlake architecture, also known as Eastlake Movement

See also

 
 East Lake (disambiguation)
 East (disambiguation)
 Lake (disambiguation)